Alex Haija is a Papua New Guinean rugby league player. He played for the Kumuls in the 2010 Four Nations.

References 

Papua New Guinean rugby league players
Living people
Papua New Guinea national rugby league team players
Year of birth missing (living people)